An artificial island is an island that has been constructed by people rather than formed by natural means. Artificial islands may vary in size from small islets reclaimed solely to support a single pillar of a building or structure to those that support entire communities and cities. Early artificial islands included floating structures in still waters or wooden or megalithic structures erected in shallow waters (e.g. crannógs and Nan Madol discussed below).

In modern times artificial islands are usually formed by land reclamation, but some are formed by the incidental isolation of an existing piece of land during canal construction (e.g. Donauinsel, Ko Kret, and much of Door County, Wisconsin), or flooding of valleys resulting in the tops of former knolls getting isolated by water (e.g., Barro Colorado Island). One of the world's largest artificial islands, René-Levasseur Island, was formed by the flooding of two adjacent reservoirs.

History
Despite a popular image of modernity, artificial islands actually have a long history in many parts of the world, dating back to the reclaimed islands of Ancient Egyptian civilization, the Stilt crannogs of prehistoric Wales, Scotland and Ireland, the ceremonial centers of Nan Madol in Micronesia and the still extant floating islands of Lake Titicaca. The city of Tenochtitlan, the Aztec predecessor of Mexico City that was home to 500,000 people when the Spaniards arrived, stood on a small natural island in Lake Texcoco that was surrounded by countless artificial chinamitl islands.

The people of Langa Langa Lagoon and Lau Lagoon in Malaita, Solomon Islands, built about 60 artificial islands on the reef including Funaafou,  Sulufou, and Adaege. The people of Lau Lagoon build islands on the reef as this provided protection against attack from the people who lived in the centre of Malaita.  These islands were formed literally one rock at a time. A family would take their canoe out to the reef which protects the lagoon and then dive for rocks, bring them to the surface and then return to the selected site and drop the rocks into the water. Living on the reef was also healthier as the mosquitoes, which infested the coastal swamps, were not found on the reef islands. The Lau people continue to live on the reef islands.

Many artificial islands have been built in urban harbors to provide either a site deliberately isolated from the city or just spare real estate otherwise unobtainable in a crowded metropolis. An example of the first case is Dejima (or Deshima), created in the bay of Nagasaki in Japan's Edo period as a contained center for European merchants. During the isolationist era, Dutch people were generally banned from Nagasaki and Japanese from Dejima. Similarly, Ellis Island, in Upper New York Bay beside New York City, a former tiny islet greatly expanded by land reclamation, served as an isolated immigration center for the United States in the late 19th and early 20th century, preventing an escape to the city of those refused entry for disease or other perceived flaws, who might otherwise be tempted toward illegal immigration. One of the most well-known artificial islands is the Île Notre-Dame in Montreal, built for Expo 67.

The Venetian Islands in Miami Beach, Florida, in Biscayne Bay added valuable new real estate during the Florida land boom of the 1920s.  When the bubble that the developers were riding burst, the bay was left scarred with the remnants of their failed project. A boom town development company was building a sea wall for an island that was to be called Isola di Lolando but could not stay in business after the 1926 Miami Hurricane and the Great Depression, dooming the island-building project. The concrete pilings from the project still stand as another development boom roared around them, 80 years later.

Largest artificial islands according to their size (reclaimed lands)

Modern projects

Bahrain
Bahrain has several artificial islands including Northern City, Diyar Al Muharraq, and Durrat Al Bahrain. Named after the ‘most perfect pearl’ in the Persian Gulf, Durrat Al Bahrain is a US$ 6 billion joint development owned by the Bahrain Mumtalakat Holding Company and Kuwait Finance House Bahrain (KFH). The project is designed by the firm Atkins. It consists of a series of 15 large artificial islands covering an area of about 5 km2 (54,000,000 sq ft) and has six atolls, five fish-shaped islands, two crescent-shaped islands, and two more small islands related to the Marina area.

Netherlands
In 1969, the Flevopolder in the Netherlands was finished, as part of the Zuiderzee Works. It has a total land surface of 970 km2, which makes it by far the largest artificial island by land reclamation in the world. The island consists of two polders, Eastern Flevoland and Southern Flevoland. Together with the Noordoostpolder, which includes some small former islands like Urk, the polders form Flevoland, the 12th province of the Netherlands that almost entirely consists of reclaimed land.

An entire artificial archipelago, Marker Wadden has been built as a conservation area for birds and other wildlife, the project started in 2016.

Maldives

Maldives have been creating various artificial islands to promote economic development and to address the threat of rising sea level. Hulhumalé island was reclaimed to establish a new land mass required to meet the existing and future housing, industrial and commercial development demands of the Malé region. The official settlement was inaugurated on May 12, 2004.

Qatar
The Pearl Island is in the north of the Qatari capital Doha, home to a range of residential, commercial and tourism activities. Qanat Quartier is designed to be a 'Virtual Venice in the Middle East'. Lusail & large areas around Ras Laffan, Hamad International Airport & Hamad Port. The New Doha International Airport is the second largest artificial island built in the world, with a size of 22km2. The Pearl-Qatar is the third largest artificial island in the world, with a size of 13.9km2. The island was built in 2006, by main contractor DEME Group.

United Arab Emirates
The United Arab Emirates is home to several artificial island projects. They include the Yas Island, augmentions to Saadiyat Island, Khalifa Port, Al Reem Island, Al Lulu Island, Al Raha Creek, al Hudairiyat Island, The Universe and the Dubai Waterfront. Palm Islands (Palm Jumeirah, Palm Jebel Ali, and Deira Island) and the World Islands off Dubai are created for leisure and tourism purposes. 
The Burj Al Arab is on its own artificial island.  The Universe, Palm Jebel Ali, Dubai Waterfront, and Palm Deira are on hold.

China

China has conducted a land reclamation project which had built at least seven artificial islands in the South China Sea totaling 2000 acres in size by mid 2015.  One artificial island built on Fiery Cross Reef near the Spratly Islands is now the site of a military barracks, lookout tower and a runway long enough to handle Chinese military aircraft.

A largely touristic and commercial project is the Ocean Flower Island project on Hainan island.

Airports
Kansai International Airport is the first airport to be built completely on an artificial island in 1994, followed by Chūbu Centrair International Airport in 2005, and both the New Kitakyushu Airport and Kobe Airport in 2006, and Ordu Giresun Airport in 2016. 

When Hong Kong International Airport opened in 1998, 75% of the property was created using land reclamation upon the existing islands of Chek Lap Kok and Lam Chau. Currently China is building several airports on artificial islands, they include runways of Shanghai international Airport Dalian Jinzhouwan International Airport being built on a 21 square kilometer artificial island, Xiamen Xiang'an International Airport, Sanya Hongtangwan International Airport designed by Bentley Systems which is being built on a 28 square kilometer artificial islands.

Environmental impact
Artificial islands negatively impact the marine environment. The large quantities of sand required to build these islands are acquired through dredging, which is harmful to coral reefs and disrupts marine life. The increased amount of sand, sediment, and fine particles creates turbid conditions, blocking necessary UV rays from reaching coral reefs, creating coral turbidity (where more organic material is taken in by coral) and increasing bacterial activity (more harmful bacteria are introduced into coral).

The construction of artificial islands also decreases the subaqueous area in surrounding waters, leading to habitat destruction or degradation for many species.

Political status
Under the United Nations Convention on the Law of the Sea treaty (UNCLOS), artificial islands are not considered harbor works (Article 11) and are under the jurisdiction of the nearest coastal state if within  (Article 56). Artificial islands are not considered islands for purposes of having their own territorial waters or exclusive economic zones, and only the coastal state may authorize their construction (Article 60); however, on the high seas beyond national jurisdiction, any "state" may construct artificial islands (Article 87).

The unrecognised micronation known as the Principality of Sealand (often shorted to simply "Sealand") is entirely on a single artificial island.

Gallery

See also

 Artificial hill
 Chinampa
 Discovery Bay, California
 Eko Atlantic
 Land reclamation in Monaco
 List of artificial islands
 Ocean colonization
 Ocean Flower Island
 Offshore geotechnical engineering
 Principality of Sealand
 Republic of Rose Island
 Seasteading
 Very large floating structure

References

External links

 Artificial Islands in The Law of the Sea

artificial

Coastal construction
Land reclamation